Archibald S Mackie (7 January 1888 - 1975) was a Scottish footballer who played for Kilmarnock, Dumbarton, Clydebank and East Stirlingshire.

References

1888 births
1975 deaths
Scottish footballers
Dumbarton F.C. players
Kilmarnock F.C. players
Clydebank F.C. (1914) players
East Stirlingshire F.C. players
Scottish Football League players
Association football wing halves
Date of death missing
Rutherglen Glencairn F.C. players